National Road 93 or simply N93, was a highway route in the Netherlands from 1957 through 1985. It formed part of the Dutch National highway network and connected Tilburg (E312) with Emmeloord (N91). A stretch of road between Tilburg and the Belgian border was also part of the initial route.

In 1957, road numbering was introduced in the Netherlands and the Rijkswegenplan foresaw in an increasing number of highways, together forming a nationwide system. Along with the pan-European E-road network, which designated routes of international importance, a series of N-roads was devised to designate those routes not included in the European system, but considered of national importance.
In 1985 the second generation of E-road numbering was implemented, leading to an update of the National Road network as well. With the N91 now heading south to Almere and Utrecht, the N93 was extended northwards. The section leading to the border with Belgium was abandoned and subsequently downgraded.

While the N-road numbers were originally signposted everywhere, they were gradually replaced on road signs by the formerly administrative Rijksweg and provincial numberings, starting in 1976 and 1978 respectively. Ultimately the old N93 was broken up into five sections that now carry different numbers.

Route overview 

Highway N93 First section (Emmeloord-Nijmegen):

Highway N93 Second section (Nijmegen - Tilburg):

The total length of the N 93 is approximately 180 kilometers (190 when the shared sections with E 25 and E 35 are included).
The majority of the route consisted of motorway, with the main interruption being the section through Nijmegen which caused significant delays. A new bridge is under construction west of the city, aimed at creating a new urban beltway. No official decision has been made public about its new road number so far.

References

Motorways in the Netherlands
Motorways in Flevoland
Motorways in Gelderland
Motorways in North Brabant
Motorways in Overijssel